Parliamentary elections were held in Iran in 1939, throughout the month of July and most of August. They were the last elections held during the reign of Reza Shah and were not considered free.

References

1939 elections in Asia
1939 in Iran
National Consultative Assembly elections
Electoral fraud in Iran